Ninel Herrera Conde is a Mexican singer, actress and television host known for her performances in Rebelde, Fuego en la sangre, Mar de amor and Porque el amor manda.

Career
Her first record production was titled Ninel Conde (2003), which contains the song "Callados", played a duet with singer José Manuel Figueroa. This material was nominated for a Latin Grammy in 2004 for "Mejor álbum grupero."

In 2004, Conde participated in the third edition of the reality show Big Brother VIP and was voted-off after 43 days of confinement. In October 2004, she began acting on Rebelde, produced by Pedro Damián. Her most remarkable role so far has been this one. Her role as Alma Rey in Rebelde (2004–2006) expanded her career to Chile, Romania, Colombia, Brasil, Peru, Spain, Croatia. This show was nominated for the awards TVyNovelas 2006 as "Best Lead Actress." Also involved in the film 7 mujeres, un homosexual y Carlos and Mujeres infieles 2.

In 2005 goes on sale their second album "La rebelde" from which emerge the songs Todo conmigo, Ingrato, Que no te asombre, y Tú. Conde began appearing on the American dramedy series Ugly Betty where she portrays an actress on a "faux" telenovela that is seen by the main character's family. She also participated in contest reality show titled El Show de los Sueños, alongside Pee Wee, Kalimba Marichal, Gloria Trevi, DJ Flex/Nigga, Mariana Seoane, and Priscila.

In 2008, she played the character Rosario Montes in Fuego en la sangre alongside Adela Noriega and Eduardo Yañez, was nominated by the participating TVyNovelas Award as "Best actress co-star."

In August 2009, Conde confirmed to appear in the Mexican telenovela Mar de amor as Coral (main-villain of the story), the telenovela was produced by Natalie Lartilleux. This show was nominated for "Best Actress antagonistic." In 2012 participates in the soap opera Porque el amor manda as Discua Paz De La Soledad.

In September 2013, she becomes a Judge on the 4th season of Univision's dancing competition Mira Quien Baila.

Personal life
From 1996 to 1998, she was married to Mexican actor Ari Telch. She and Telch have one daughter together: Sofía (born May 7, 1997). On December 7, 2007, Conde married her second husband, businessman Juan Zepeda. The couple separated in August 2013. It was reported in 2015 that the marriage to Zepeda has invalid as he was already married to María Sol Corral of Ecuador. It was reported in October 2013 that Conde was dating businessman Giovanni Medina. In April 2014, Conde announced that she and Medina were expecting a baby boy. On October 21, 2014 she gave birth to their son Emmanuel. Ninel Conde married her third husband Larry Ramos on October 28, 2020.

Filmography

Television

Discography

Studio albums

Compilation albums

EPs

Singles

Music videos

Album appearances

References

External links
Ninel Conde's Official Site
Ninel Conde's Official Channel in YouTube

Ninel Conde Madrina de Carnaval Manzanillo 2012 rueda de prensa
Madrina de lujo Ninel Conde arranca el primer desfile del Carnaval Manzanillo 2012

Year of birth missing (living people)
Living people
Mexican telenovela actresses
Mexican film actresses
Mexican female models
Mexican vedettes
Actresses from the State of Mexico
Singers from the State of Mexico
20th-century Mexican actresses
21st-century Mexican actresses
People from Toluca
21st-century Mexican singers
21st-century Mexican women singers
Women in Latin music
Mexican Christians
Mexican LGBT rights activists